Dreamin' is the second studio album by Liverpool Express, released in March 1978, in South America only. The album features the band's hit single, "Dreamin'''. Other popular song's from this album are: "So Here I Go Again"; "Margie"; "Last Train Home"; and "Songbird, Sing Your Song"''.

The album was released on CD for the first time in 2017 along with "Tracks" and "L.E.X.". Each CD was presented in a boxset with a booklet detailing the band's history.

Track listing
Side one
"Low Profile" (Roger Scott Craig, Billy Kinsley, Tony Coates, Derek Cashin)
"So Here I Go Again" (Billy Kinsley)
"Last Train Home" (Billy Kinsley)
"Margie" (Billy Kinsley)
"Songbird, Sing Your Song" (Roger Scott Craig)

Side two
"Little Plum's Last Stand" (Roger Scott Craig, Billy Kinsley, Tony Coates, Derek Cashin)
"Mary & Ann" (Roger Scott Craig)
"Dreamin'" (Roger Scott Craig, Billy Kinsley)
"All Time Loser" (Roger Scott Craig, Billy Kinsley, Tony Coates, Derek Cashin)
"Don't Give Up Your Day Job" (Billy Kinsley)

Personnel
Liverpool Express
Billy Kinsley – lead, harmony and backing vocals, bass guitar, acoustic guitar
Tony Coates – harmony, and backing vocals, rhythm guitar, lead, acoustic guitar
Roger Scott Craig – lead, harmony and backing vocals, piano
Derek Cashin – lead, harmony and backing vocals, drums

Additional musicians
Judd Lander - Harmonica on "Last Train Home".
Kathy McCabe - backing vocals on "Last Train Home".

External links
Official Website
 

1978 albums
Liverpool Express albums
Warner Records albums